Minchenden School was a mixed secondary school situated in Southgate, North London, established in 1919 with 90 pupils. It merged with Arnos School in 1984.

History
The school was established in 1919 in Tottenhall Road as a mixed secondary school. In 1924, it moved to Southgate House, where it remained until 1987. The staff and pupils built an observatory. From 1960 to the early 1970s, there was an annexe in the Fox Lane school, Palmers Green. The annexe catered for the 1st 2 years of pupils. The school's English department was particularly strong. Head of English Douglas Barnes 1959-1966 introduced a series of important innovations in teaching methods. In 1967, Minchenden Grammar School was converted from a grammar school to Minchenden School, a comprehensive school, with the upper school in High Street and the lower school in Fox Lane. It was merged with Arnos School in 1984 to form Broomfield School, after the Conservative council sold the extensive playing fields to a development company to build homes, with the original Southgate House protected as a Grade I listed building.

The building is now used by Durants School, having previously been used by Southgate College.

Former teachers
 James Kirkup, poet

Notable alumni
 Graham Robert Allan, mathematician and an expert on Banach algebras, Professor of Pure Mathematics from 1970 to 1978 at the University of Leeds
 Neville Brody (born 1957), graphic designer, typographer and art director
 Prof. Harold Brookfield (born 1926), scholar of rural development, Australian National University
 Prof Peter Clarricoats CBE, Professor of Electronic Engineering from 1968 to 1997 at Queen Mary and Westfield, and vice-president from 1989 to 1991 of the Institution of Electrical Engineers (since 2006 the Institution of Engineering and Technology) Fellow of the Royal Society (1990)
 Nick Dunning, actor - credits include The Tudors, My Boy Jack, Alexander
 Judy Dyble (1949-2020), Singer songwriter and founder member of Fairport Convention
 Irving Finkel (born 1951), philologist and Assyriologist
Professor Brian J Ford (born 1939), scientist, author, broadcaster and lecturer
 Lynne Franks (born 1948), public relations innovator
 Judy Fryd (1909–2000), political campaigner
 Hazel Genn (born 1949), legal academic
 Anthony Giddens, Baron Giddens (born 1938), sociologist, Director from 1997 to 2003 of the London School of Economics
 John Hodge (1929–2021), engineer and NASA flight director
 Jana Jeruma-Grinberga (born 1953) former bishop in the Lutheran Church
 Peter Kellner (born 1946), journalist and political commentator
 William Orbit (born 1956), musician, composer and record producer
 Chris Pond (born 1952), Labour MP from 1997 to 2005 for Gravesham
 David Puttnam, Baron Puttnam (born 1941), film producer and politician
 Martin Rushent (born 1948), record producer
 Peter Sallis (1921-2017), actor
 Sir Peter Soulsby (born 1948), mayor of Leicester and former Labour MP for Leicester South
 Barry Took (1928–2002), comedian, writer and television presenter
 John Wimpenny (1922-2015), aerodynamicist and holder of the world record for man-powered flight for ten years from 1962, when he flew the Hatfield Puffin over a distance of 995 yards.

References

Further reading
 Minchenden School golden anniversary, 1919–1969, published by Minchenden School, 1969 
 Douglas Barnes, Becoming an English Teacher (London: NATE, 2000)

External links
 Social Change and English, 1945-1965 - Minchenden is one of three schools in London that are included in this Leverhulme Trust-funded project about the teaching of English in the period 1945–1965. The project is collecting oral histories from former teachers and pupils at the school.

Defunct schools in the London Borough of Enfield
Educational institutions established in 1919
Educational institutions disestablished in 1984
Defunct grammar schools in England
1919 establishments in England
1984 disestablishments in England